Jack Arnold Elder (born 3 July 1949) is a New Zealand former politician. He was an MP from 1984 to 1999, representing the Labour Party, New Zealand First and Mauri Pacific.

Early life
Jack Elder was born and raised in West Auckland, attending New Lynn Primary, Avondale Intermediate and Kelston Boys High School – where he was head boy and captain of the rugby first fifteen. Elder studied politics and history at the University of Auckland and alongside future Prime Minister Helen Clark and future Minister of Foreign Affairs Phil Goff was a member of Princes Street Labour. Elder was awarded a B.A in both History and Political Studies as well as a M.A in Political Studies. He then became a teacher at schools such as Henderson High School from 1974 to 1977 and Rutherford College from 1979 to 1981.

He was a member of the New Lynn Borough Council from 1976 to 1983 including being elected Deputy Mayor in 1980.

In 1975 he unsuccessfully sought the Labour Party candidacy for the  electorate alongside 26 other aspirants following the retirement of Hugh Watt, but lost to Frank Rogers. In 1980 he put his name forward to replace long serving MP Warren Freer in the safe Labour seat of Mount Albert, but missed out on the nomination to Helen Clark.

Member of Parliament

He was re-elected in the 1987 election, the 1990 election, and in the 1993 election.

In 1990, Elder was awarded the New Zealand 1990 Commemoration Medal. After the 1990 election he was appointed Shadow Minister of Agriculture by Mike Moore. In January 1993 he also picked up the Overseas Trade portfolio in a minor reshuffle.

Within the Labour Party, Elder was a staunch supporter of Moore, and belonged to the more economically liberal wing of the party. When Helen Clark replaced Moore as party leader he was dropped from the Agriculture portfolio, but continued as Shadow Minister of Overseas Trade. Elder remained aligned with Moore and consequently he was ranked 40th on Labour's party list, the lowest of any sitting MP. In response he questioned his ties with Labour and position in parliament, not ruling out resigning and forcing a by-election.

Clark countered Elder's critiques saying Elder's list ranking reflected his lack of achievements as an MP. Elder bridled at Clark's comments, pointing to his 29 year membership and his time as Shadow Minister of Agriculture where he laboriously explained party policy to "incredulous farmers". He was clear that he didn't blame Clark and thought party processes and policies were responsible for his dissatisfaction.

When suggestions arose that Moore would found a new party, Elder was considered likely to follow. In the end, Moore remained with Labour, but Elder was still dissatisfied. On 3 April 1996, Elder left the Labour Party to join New Zealand First, a centrist conservative party led by Winston Peters. He became New Zealand First's spokesman for local government.

National Coalition Government
In the 1996 election, Elder was re-elected to Parliament as a list MP for New Zealand First, having unsuccessfully contested the Waipareira electorate. When New Zealand First formed a coalition with the governing National Party, Elder was appointed to Cabinet, becoming Minister of Internal Affairs, Minister of Police, and Minister of Civil Defence. As Minister of Police Elder officially opened the Queenstown Police Station on Friday 10 July 1998. When New Zealand First's coalition with National began to collapse, however, Elder joined the group of MPs who quit New Zealand First and continued to offer support to the Government. He officially left New Zealand First on 18 August 1998. In exchange for his continued support for the government, Elder was allowed to remain Minister of Internal Affairs and Minister of Civil Defence, although he was no longer part of Cabinet.

Later, Elder joined with four other former New Zealand First MPs to found the Mauri Pacific Party. Elder eventually chose not to seek re-election, and retired from politics at the 1999 election.

Later life
Elder spent time off from working, before returning to teaching two years after leaving Parliament.

Notes

References

|-

1949 births
Living people
People educated at Kelston Boys' High School
University of Auckland alumni
New Zealand educators
Local politicians in New Zealand
Deputy mayors of places in New Zealand
Members of the Cabinet of New Zealand
New Zealand First MPs
New Zealand Labour Party MPs
Mauri Pacific MPs
New Zealand list MPs
Members of the New Zealand House of Representatives
New Zealand MPs for Auckland electorates
Unsuccessful candidates in the 1981 New Zealand general election
Unsuccessful candidates in the 1978 New Zealand general election